The Never Ending Tour is the popular name for Bob Dylan's endless touring schedule since June 7, 1988.

Tour
In 2005, Dylan toured the United States with Merle Haggard. The tour included several residencies at various venues. These included three nights in Seattle, two nights in Portland, three nights in Oakland, five nights in Los Angeles, two nights in Denver, five nights in Chicago, two nights in Milwaukee, three nights in Boston and five nights in New York City.

After completing the first leg of the tour Dylan started out on a US ballpark tour with Willie Nelson starting in South Fort Myers, Florida on May 25 and ended Saint Paul, Minnesota on July 12.

Five days after the end of the previous leg Dylan performed six shows in Canada without any co-headliners and five shows in the United States.

Dylan returned to Europe after 15 months in the fall of 2005. He performed 31 shows over the space of two months covering 13 countries and 27 cities. The tour started in Stockholm, Sweden on October 17 and finished on November 27 in Dublin, Ireland.

Tour dates

Festivals and other miscellaneous performances

<small>
This concert was a part of "Willie Nelson's Fourth of July Picnic"
This concert was a part of "Amazon.com 10th Anniversary Event"

References

External links

BobLinks – Comprehensive log of concerts and set lists
Bjorner's Still on the Road – Information on recording sessions and performances

Bob Dylan concert tours
2005 concert tours